KLCE (97.3 FM) is a radio station broadcasting an adult contemporary format. Licensed to Blackfoot, Idaho, the station serves the East Idaho area. The station is currently owned by Riverbend Communications, LLC.

History
The station was assigned the calls KBLI on June 2, 1980. On May 10, 1984, the station changed its call sign to the current KLCE.
KLCE is a successful market leader with their adult contemporary format.  The station continues to serve the adult female demographic in East Idaho.

References

External links

LCE
Mainstream adult contemporary radio stations in the United States